Preston School is a secondary school with specialist Business and Enterprise College status in Yeovil, Somerset, England. In 2017, enrolment was 975 students aged 11 to 18 years. In July 2011, the school became an Academy.

History

Preston School opened in 1961. The school was awarded Specialist school status as a Business and Enterprise college in September 2002.

Curriculum

Preston School has a range of technology facilities; wireless internet across site, integrated ICT desks in several classrooms, Apple Macs in the music department, and a £20,000 recording studio. It has a dance and fitness studio. The school offers specialist GCSE courses, including sport BTEC, business BTEC and dance.

Performance 
As of 2020, the school's most recent Ofsted inspection was in 2019, with a judgement of Requires Improvement.

Notable alumni
Sarah Parish, actress

References

External links
 

Academies in Somerset
Yeovil
Secondary schools in Somerset
Specialist business and enterprise colleges